Alencier Ley Lopez is an Indian film and theatre actor, who appears in Malayalam films. Lopez made his debut in the 1998 film Daya; and he worked in films like Annayum Rasoolum (2013), Njan Steve Lopez (2013), and Maheshinte Prathikaaram (2016). At the 48th Kerala State Film Awards, he won the Best Character Actor Award for his performance in Thondimuthalum Driksakshiyum (2017).

Personal life

Alencier Ley Lopez is from a Latin Catholic family from Puthenthope, a coastal village in Thiruvananthapuram, Kerala. He graduated from St. Xavier's College, Thumba and University College Thiruvananthapuram. Alencier is married to Suseela George, a mathematics teacher. The couple has two sons Alen Savio Lopez and Alen Steve Lopez.

Acting career

Early years in theatre
Lopez developed a passion for theatre early in life after witnessing the Leyon Lopez Nadakaolsavam (theatre festival). His theatre debut was at the age of five. Later Lopez and some friends formed their own troupe – the Netaji Theatre, directing and acting in their own plays. After graduating school Lopez decided to chase a career as an actor or a priest. In college he partnered with various theatre troupes such as C. P. Krishnakumar's troupe, Kavalam Narayana Panicker's Sopanam and K. Raghu's Natakayogam. He continued his career in theatre until the platforms of performance arts were taken over by scene platforms film and television. He has also acted in Nokketha doorathu TV serial on Mazhavil Manorama.

Films

Lopez was introduced to films by cinematographer-director Venu in his directorial debut Daya in 1998. He played one of the leads in K. R. Manoj's Kanyaka Talkies (2013), which was screened in major film festivals and received critical applause. Then in Vedivazhipadu (2013), as a typical south Kerala Brahmin. In 2013, director Rajiv Ravi cast him in Annayum Rasoolum starring Fahadh Faasil and later in Njan Steve Lopez (2014). In 2015, Lopez starred in Maheshinte Prathikaaram (2015) at the recommendation of Faasil, which became his first major break. In 2017, he did a role in the film Thondimuthalum Drisakhsiyum, directed by Dileesh Pothan.

Sexual harassment allegations
Divya Gopinath, who worked with him on Abhasam, alleged that he sexually harassed her on the sets of the film. The director of Aabhasam claimed that Alencier came drunk to the sets and messed up many of the shots which affected the continuity of the shooting. Another American woman was also allegedly harassed by Lopez when he was in the United States filming for Monsoon Mangoes.

Filmography

All films are in Malayalam language unless otherwise noted.

Awards
Kerala State Film Award for Best Character Actor : Thondimuthalum Driksakshiyum
Filmfare Award for Best Supporting Actor – Malayalam : Thondimuthalum Driksakshiyum
Flowers Indian Film Awards - Best Supporting actor: Thondimuthalum Driksakshiyum
Asianet Film Awards 2018  - Best Supporting actor: Thondimuthalum Driksakshiyum
CPC Cine Awards 2017- Best Character artist: Thondimuthalum Driksakshiyum

References

External links
 
 https://www.cinemaexpress.com/malayalam/videos/2021/dec/17/appan-trailer-sunny-wayne-starrer-promises-a-dark-comedy-on-parent-child-conflict-28500.html
 https://www.newindianexpress.com/entertainment/malayalam/2021/dec/18/appan-trailer-sunny-wayne-majus-dark-comedy-delves-into-parent-child-conflicts-2396740.html
 https://www.koimoi.com/south-indian-cinema/alencier-ley-lopez-apologises-to-venu-after-director-raises-the-issue-with-the-association-of-malayalam-movie-artists-amma/
 https://timesofindia.indiatimes.com/entertainment/malayalam/movies/news/sunny-waynes-film-appan-is-getting-ready-makers-announce-an-exciting-update/articleshow/88540639.cms
 https://www.thehindu.com/entertainment/movies/in-conversation-with-state-film-award-winner-alencier-ley-lopez/article23379621.ece
 https://www.newindianexpress.com/entertainment/malayalam/2016/oct/25/acting-with-the-superstars-1531804.html
 https://www.newindianexpress.com/entertainment/malayalam/2021/sep/04/trailer-of-rajeev-ravis-true-crime-drama-kuttavum-shikshayum-lands-2353997.html
 https://english.mathrubhumi.com/news/kerala/actor-alencier-launches-complaint-against-gouging-out-eyes-remark-1.2317741
 https://indianexpress.com/article/entertainment/malayalam/manju-warrier-withdraws-chathur-mukham-from-theatres-promises-to-re-release-when-its-safe-7285835/

1965 births
Living people
Indian male film actors
Indian male stage actors
Male actors in Malayalam cinema
Malayalam comedians
Male actors from Thiruvananthapuram
20th-century Indian male actors
21st-century Indian male actors